"Sirpal" or "Sarpal" is considered a very high caste in Punjabi Khatri family surnames originating from the region of Punjab in the Indian Subcontinent, today straddling India and Pakistan and is common with both Hindu and Sikh families.

References 

Indian surnames
Khatri clans
Punjabi tribes
Social groups of Punjab, India